Martin Mitchell is a Cook Islands international rugby league footballer who plays as a  or  for the Southport Tigers A grade team in the Coast to Coast Earth moving Cup on the Gold Coast.

Background
Mitchell was born in Auckland, New Zealand, and is of Cook Islander descent.

Playing career
Mitchell has previously played for the Mt Albert Lions in the Auckland Rugby League, the Auckland Lions in the Bartercard Cup and the Auckland Lions and Wentworthville Magpies in the NSW Cup.

In 2009 and 2010 he played for Toulouse Olympique in the Co-operative Championship.

In 2010 Mitchell joined the Burleigh Bears in the Queensland Cup.

Representative career
In 2010 Mitchell represented the Cook Islands in a match against the Country Rugby League. He had previously represented the side in 2005.

References

External links
Toulouse Olympique profile

1986 births
Living people
Auckland rugby league team players
Burleigh Bears players
Cook Islands national rugby league team players
Mount Albert Lions players
New Zealand rugby league players
New Zealand sportspeople of Cook Island descent
Rugby league halfbacks
Rugby league hookers
Rugby league players from Auckland
Toulouse Olympique players
Wentworthville Magpies players